Shalmaneser (Salmānu-ašarēd) was the name of five kings of Assyria:

 Shalmaneser I ( 1274–1245 BC)
 Shalmaneser II (1030–1019 BC)
 Shalmaneser III (859–824 BC)
 Shalmaneser IV (783–773 BC)
 Shalmaneser V (727–722 BC), who appears in the Bible as the conqueror of the Kingdom of Israel

It may also refer to:

 Shalmaneser, an artificial intelligence in John Brunner's 1969 novel Stand on Zanzibar
 Salmanazar, a wine bottle size measuring 9 litres
 George Psalmanazar (c. 1679–1763), a Frenchman who posed as a Formosan immigrant